Laurence Ashburnham (15 July 1875 – 21 May 1951) was a South African cricketer. He played in three first-class matches in 1896/97 and 1909/10.

References

External links
 

1875 births
1951 deaths
South African cricketers
Eastern Province cricketers
Rhodesia cricketers
People from Makana Local Municipality